The accident on the Rampe de Laffrey on July 18, 1973, remains, the worst to ever have occurred along that stretch of roadway, among the worst in France.  A bus was carrying Belgian pilgrims from Braine-le-Comte returning from a visit to the shrine of Our Lady of La Salette; it missed a curve at the base of the road, near its intersection with the bridge over the Romanche, and overturned.  Forty-three people were killed and six injured in the resulting crash.  After the crash the mayor of Laffrey condemned the route as being particularly dangerous, as it had already claimed over one hundred lives over the previous quarter-century.

The accident is sometimes referred to as the accident de Vizille because it occurred very close to the entrance of the town of that name; the crash site, however, is actually located within the boundaries of the commune of Notre-Dame-de-Mésage.  Today a memorial to the victims stands at the site of the accident; it claims the number of dead as forty-five.

References

1973 road incidents
Road incidents in France
1973 in France
Bus incidents in France
July 1973 events in Europe
1973 disasters in France